Katsuhisa Akasaki (born March 3, 1974) is a Japanese mixed martial artist. He competed in the Featherweight division.

Mixed martial arts record

|-
| Loss
| align=center| 6-20-1
| Yuji Sato
| Decision (split)
| Gladiator: Gladiator 59
| 
| align=center| 2
| align=center| 5:00
| Fukuoka, Japan
| 
|-
| Win
| align=center| 6-19-1
| Young-Jun Kim
| Decision (unanimous)
| KAMA: Korean All-MMA Association vs. Gladiator 2012
| 
| align=center| 2
| align=center| 3:00
| Seoul, South Korea
| 
|-
| Win
| align=center| 5-19-1
| Tatsumi Ashikari
| Submission (armbar)
| Gladiator: Gladiator 39
| 
| align=center| 2
| align=center| 3:11
| Fukuoka, Japan
| 
|-
| Win
| align=center| 4-19-1
| Masayuki Sato
| Submission (heel hook)
| Gladiator: Gladiator 30
| 
| align=center| 1
| align=center| 0:30
| Fukuoka, Japan
| 
|-
| Loss
| align=center| 3-19-1
| Seong-Jae Kim
| TKO (punches)
| Gladiator: Gladiator 26
| 
| align=center| 2
| align=center| 0:00
| Fukuoka, Japan
| 
|-
| Win
| align=center| 3-18-1
| Suguru Kawabata
| Submission (heel hook)
| Gladiator: Gladiator 18
| 
| align=center| 2
| align=center| 1:02
| Fukuoka, Japan
| 
|-
| Loss
| align=center| 2-18-1
| Minoru Takeuchi
| Submission (guillotine choke)
| Shooto: Genesis
| 
| align=center| 1
| align=center| 1:40
| Kitakyushu, Fukuoka, Japan
| 
|-
| Loss
| align=center| 2-17-1
| Nobuhiro Hayakawa
| Submission (rear-naked choke)
| Shooto: Trilogy 1
| 
| align=center| 1
| align=center| 2:51
| Hakata-ku, Fukuoka, Japan
| 
|-
| Loss
| align=center| 2-16-1
| Yasuo Niki
| TKO (punches)
| Shooto: Grapplingman 8
| 
| align=center| 2
| align=center| 2:23
| Hiroshima, Japan
| 
|-
| Loss
| align=center| 2-15-1
| Tsuyoshi Okada
| Decision (unanimous)
| Shooto: Grapplingman 7
| 
| align=center| 2
| align=center| 5:00
| Hiroshima, Japan
| 
|-
| Loss
| align=center| 2-14-1
| Hiroharu Matsufuji
| Submission (kimura)
| Shooto: 3/21 in Kitazawa Town Hall
| 
| align=center| 2
| align=center| 3:04
| Setagaya, Tokyo, Japan
| 
|-
| Loss
| align=center| 2-13-1
| Takeshi Sato
| Decision (majority)
| Shooto 2007: 6/30 in Kitazawa Town Hall
| 
| align=center| 2
| align=center| 5:00
| Setagaya, Tokyo, Japan
| 
|-
| Win
| align=center| 2-12-1
| Kenji Hosoya
| Decision (unanimous)
| Shooto: 11/30 in Kitazawa Town Hall
| 
| align=center| 2
| align=center| 5:00
| Setagaya, Tokyo, Japan
| 
|-
| Loss
| align=center| 1-12-1
| Homare Kuboyama
| Decision (unanimous)
| Shooto: 4/23 in Hakata Star Lanes
| 
| align=center| 2
| align=center| 5:00
| Tokyo, Japan
| 
|-
| Loss
| align=center| 1-11-1
| Keisuke Kurata
| TKO (cut)
| Shooto: Gig Central 3
| 
| align=center| 1
| align=center| 2:35
| Nagoya, Aichi, Japan
| 
|-
| Win
| align=center| 1-10-1
| Nat McIntyre
| Submission (heel hook)
| Shooto: 2/6 in Kitazawa Town Hall
| 
| align=center| 2
| align=center| 3:34
| Setagaya, Tokyo, Japan
| 
|-
| Loss
| align=center| 0-10-1
| Shinichi Hanawa
| DQ (knee to the head on the ground)
| Shooto: Wanna Shooto Japan
| 
| align=center| 1
| align=center| 4:00
| Setagaya, Tokyo, Japan
| 
|-
| Loss
| align=center| 0-9-1
| Masatoshi Abe
| Decision (unanimous)
| Shooto: Treasure Hunt 2
| 
| align=center| 2
| align=center| 5:00
| Setagaya, Tokyo, Japan
| 
|-
| Loss
| align=center| 0-8-1
| Yasuhiro Urushitani
| Decision (majority)
| Shooto: To The Top 9
| 
| align=center| 2
| align=center| 5:00
| Tokyo, Japan
| 
|-
| Loss
| align=center| 0-7-1
| Seiji Ozuka
| Decision (split)
| Shooto: To The Top 5
| 
| align=center| 2
| align=center| 5:00
| Setagaya, Tokyo, Japan
| 
|-
| Loss
| align=center| 0-6-1
| Yoshihiro Fujita
| Submission (kimura)
| Shooto: Gig East 1
| 
| align=center| 1
| align=center| 5:00
| Tokyo, Japan
| 
|-
| Loss
| align=center| 0-5-1
| Toshiteru Ishii
| DQ (kneeing to the head on the ground)
| Shooto: To The Top 3
| 
| align=center| 2
| align=center| 2:46
| Setagaya, Tokyo, Japan
| 
|-
| Loss
| align=center| 0-4-1
| Ryota Matsune
| Decision (unanimous)
| Shooto: R.E.A.D. 11
| 
| align=center| 2
| align=center| 5:00
| Setagaya, Tokyo, Japan
| 
|-
| Draw
| align=center| 0-3-1
| Takeshi Takamatsu
| Draw
| Daidojuku: WARS 5
| 
| align=center| 3
| align=center| 3:00
| Japan
| 
|-
| Loss
| align=center| 0-3
| Yoshiyuki Takayama
| Submission (rear naked choke)
| Shooto: Gig '98 1st
| 
| align=center| 1
| align=center| 3:34
| Tokyo, Japan
| 
|-
| Loss
| align=center| 0-2
| Masahiro Oishi
| Submission (armbar)
| Shooto: Let's Get Lost
| 
| align=center| 1
| align=center| 2:12
| Tokyo, Japan
| 
|-
| Loss
| align=center| 0-1
| Hisao Ikeda
| Decision (majority)
| Shooto: Free Fight Kawasaki
| 
| align=center| 3
| align=center| 3:00
| Kawasaki, Kanagawa, Japan
|

See also
List of male mixed martial artists

References

External links
 
 Katsuhisa Akasaki at mixedmartialarts.com
 Katsuhisa Akasaki at fightmatrix.com

1974 births

Japanese male mixed martial artists
Featherweight mixed martial artists
Living people